Independent Operational Group Narew (Samodzielna Grupa Operacyjna Narew, SGO Narew) was one of the Polish Army Corps (Operational Groups) that defended Poland during the Invasion of Poland in 1939. It was created on 23 March 1939 and was commanded by general Czesław Młot-Fijałkowski.


Tasks
SGO Narew was to defend the north-eastern frontline near the Lithuanian border, and prevent the German forces from crossing Narew and Biebrza rivers. It was to secure the left flank of Modlin Army.

Operational history
The SGO Narew was defeated in the battle of Zambrów on 6 September, with the 18th Infantry Division being mostly destroyed. The remaining units retreated to Puszcza Białowieska large forest complex, and were later incorporated into Independent Operational Group Polesie.

Organization
The commander of the unit was general Czesław Młot-Fijałkowski. His chief of staff was colonel Stanisław Podkowiński.

It consisted of 2 infantry divisions and 2 cavalry brigades:

 18th Infantry Division.
 33rd Infantry Division ( - reserve.).
 Podlaska Cavalry Brigade.
 Suwalska Cavalry Brigade.
Air Units attached to SGO Narew:
 Polish 151st Fighter Escadrille
 Reconnaissance Squadron 51
 Polish 13th Observation Escadrille
 Liaison Platoon No. 9

References

 Armie i samodzielne grupy operacyjne Wojska Polskiego 1939  WIEM Encyklopedia

Polesie
Military units and formations established in 1939
Military units and formations disestablished in 1939